The Ruby Roadhouse, located in Olson Street in Ruby, Alaska, is a historic building that was listed on the U.S. National Register of Historic Places in 1982.  It has also been known as US Commissioner's Office and as Army Signal Corps Station.  It has served as a courthouse, as a hotel, as government offices, as a health clinic, and as a military facility.  The listing included one contributing building and one contributing structure.

It was formed from the 1913 house of Oscar Tackstrom that was used by the Army Signal Corps, plus a second building, Doc Frosts's medical clinic, built in 1911, that was later attached.

See also
National Register of Historic Places listings in Yukon–Koyukuk Census Area, Alaska

References

Buildings and structures in Yukon–Koyukuk Census Area, Alaska
Commercial buildings on the National Register of Historic Places in Alaska
Hotel buildings on the National Register of Historic Places in Alaska
Buildings and structures on the National Register of Historic Places in Yukon–Koyukuk Census Area, Alaska